Ningxiu Township (Mandarin: 宁秀乡) is a township under the jurisdiction of Zêkog County, Huangnan Tibetan Autonomous Prefecture, Qinghai, China. In 2010, Ningxiu Township had a total population of 14,620: 7,246 males and 7,374 females: 5,079 aged under 14, 8,869 aged between 15 and 65 and 672 aged over 65.

References 

Huangnan Tibetan Autonomous Prefecture
Township-level divisions of Qinghai